New Ways of Analyzing Variation Asia-Pacific (often shortened to NWAV Asia-Pacific or NWAV-AP) is an annual academic conference in sociolinguistics and the first sister conference of New Ways of Analyzing Variation. NWAV Asia-Pacific focuses on research based on empirical data with an emphasis on quantitative analysis of variation and change across the Asia-Pacific region, including speech communities, multilingualism, urbanization and migration, sociophonetics, style-shifting, language contact, variation in minority languages, dialect variation and change, dialect contact, variation in acquisition, language change across the lifespan, perceptual dialectology, and other related topics such as technological resources for sociolinguistic research. The first NWAV Asia-Pacific conference was held at University of Delhi, India in February, 2011, which included an inaugural conference address by William Labov.

The NWAV Asia/Pacific conference series has also led to the founding of a new peer-reviewed journal focused on language variation and change in this region:
Asia-Pacific Language Variation (Benjamins Publishing).

Past conferences

See also
 New Ways of Analyzing Variation
 Researching language variation and change
 Dialectology
 Linguistics conferences
 Sociolinguistics
 Variable rules analysis

Sociolinguistics